Hypsilurus bruijnii, also known commonly as the Bruijn forest dragon, the Bruijni forest dragon, and Bruijn's forest dragon, is a species of lizard in the family Agamidae. The species is native to Indonesia and Papua New Guinea.

Etymology
The specific name, bruijnii, is in honor of Dutch naturalist Anton August Bruijn.

Habitat
The natural habitat of H. bruijnii is rainforest.

Description

Reproduction
H. bruijnii is oviparous.

References

Further reading
Peters W, Doria G (1978). "Catalogo dei rettili e dei batraci raccolti da O. Beccari, L. M. D' Albertis e A. A. Bruijn nella sotto-regione austro-malese". Annali del Museo Civico di Storia Naturale di Genova, [First Series] 13: 323–450 + Plates I–VII. ("Gonyocephalus (Hypsilurus) Bruijnii ", new species, pp. 379–380). (in Italian and Latin).

Hypsilurus
Taxa named by Wilhelm Peters
Taxa named by Giacomo Doria
Reptiles described in 1878
Agamid lizards of New Guinea